Pseudogracilibacillus marinus is a Gram-positive, rod-shaped, endospore-forming, aerobic and motile bacterium from the genus of Pseudogracilibacillus which has been isolated from biofilm from seawater.

References

External links
Type strain of Pseudogracilibacillus marinus at BacDive -  the Bacterial Diversity Metadatabase

 

Bacillaceae
Bacteria described in 2016